Prema is a 1952 Indian romance film, produced and directed by P. S. Ramakrishna Rao under the Bharani Studios banner. The film is simultaneously made in Telugu and Tamil languages, the latter titled Kaadhal. It stars P. Bhanumathi and Akkineni Nageswara Rao with music composed by C. R. Subburaman. Bhanumathi wrote the story, for the first time.

Plot 
Raja (Akkineni Nageswara Rao) accompanies his rich maternal uncle Sundara Rao (Doraswamy) to a hill resort to help the latter recoup his health. There he falls in love with Moti (Bhanumathi), a tribal woman, and she too responds. A tribal goon Parasuram (Mukkamala) is after Moti. One night, Sundara Rao suddenly develops chest pain and Raja rushes him to a city hospital. Moti's parents, Khaderao (K.V. Subba Rao) and mother Bansi (Surabhi Kamala Bai) fix her marriage with Parasuram. Moti manages to escape. Meanwhile, Raja returns to the village, and, on knowing that Moti's marriage is being performed with Parasuram, is dejected and leaves for the city. Moti, who is now in the city with the hope of meeting Raja, sees him with Latha (Sriranjani), daughter of Sundara Rao, and assumes they are married. Crestfallen, she runs madly in the streets and meets with a car accident. Sivaswamy (CSR), a beggar, saves her and takes her to his house. A drama contractor Raoji (Relangi) and his assistant (Sivarao) take Moti into their troupe and train her for the title role of Sakunthala in their drama. Raja and Latha attend the drama. The two lovers, Moti and Raja exchange notes about their single status, and their love blossoms again. Latha and Sundara Rao plot to separate them and succeed in their attempt. Moti sacrifices her love for Latha and leaves for her village. Parasuram kills her when she refuses to yield to him and is in turn killed by her friend Chimli. Raja gets to know the truth from Latha and rushes to the village to meet Moti. Latha follows him. Both pay their homage to Moti.

Cast 
Bhanumathi as Mothi
Nageswara Rao as Raja

Telugu
C.S.R as Sivaswamy
Relangi as Raoji
Mukkamala as Parasuram
Kasturi Siva Rao as Raoji's Assistant
Doraiswamy as Sundara Rao
Suryakantham as Chimlli
Sriranjani as Latha
Surabhi Kamalabai as Omvssi

Tamil
Mukkamala as Parasuram
Sriranjani Jr. as Latha
Relangi as Raoji
C. S. R. as Sivaswami
Siva Rao as Assistant
Sooryakantham as Chimili
Duraiswami as Sundara Rao
Surabhi Kamalabai as Bansi
K.V. Subba Rao as Kate Rao
A. L. Narayana as Watchman
K. S. Angamuthu as Jagathambal

Soundtrack 

Music was composed by C. R. Subburaman. Lyrics were by Kondamudi Goparaya Sarma.
Telugu

Tamil
Lyrics were by K. D. Santhanam.

References

Bibliography

External links 
 
 

1950s Tamil-language films
1950s Telugu-language films
1952 films
Films directed by P. S. Ramakrishna Rao
Films scored by C. R. Subbaraman
Indian black-and-white films
Indian multilingual films
Indian romance films